The 1992–93 season was the 54th season in UE Lleida's existence, and their 3rd consecutive year in Segunda División, and covered the period from 1992-07-01 to 1993-06-30.

First-team squad

Transfers

In

Squad stats
Updated to games played on 30 June 1994. Only lists players who made an appearance or were on the bench.
Apps = Appearance(s); CS = Clean sheet(s);  G = Goal(s);  YC = Yellow card(s); L = League; C = Cup.To see the table ordered by certain column title click that column header icon  once or twice.
Goalkeepers

Outfield players

Competitions

Pre-season

Segunda División

Copa del Rey

Results summary

1993
Lleida
Lleida
Lleida